Uruguay competed in the 2015 Pan American Games in Toronto, Canada from July 10 to 26, 2015.

Sailor Dolores Moreira was named the flagbearer of the country at the opening ceremony, after track and field athlete Déborah Rodríguez could not arrive on time to Toronto due to flight problems.

Competitors
The following table lists Uruguay's delegation per sport and gender.

Medalists

Athletics (track and field)

Uruguay qualified five track and field athletes (three men and two women).

Key
Note–Ranks given for track events are for the entire round
Q = Qualified for the next round
q = Qualified for the next round as a fastest loser or, in field events, by position without achieving the qualifying target
NR = National record
GR = Games record
SB = Seasonal best
DNF = Did not finish
NM = No mark
N/A = Round not applicable for the event

Track & road events

Field events

Beach volleyball

Uruguay has qualified a men's and women's pair for a total of four athletes.

Canoeing

Sprint
Uruguay has qualified 6 athletes in the sprint discipline (all 6 in men's kayak).

Men

Qualification Legend: QF = Qualify to final; QS = Qualify to semifinal

Cycling

Mountain biking
Uruguay has qualified two male cyclists.

Equestrian

Uruguay qualified eight equestrians across all three disciplines.

Dressage

Eventing

Jumping

Field hockey

Women's tournament

Pool B

Quarterfinal

Classification semifinal

Fifth place match

Football

Men's tournament

Uruguay has qualified a men's team of 18 athletes.

Roster

Group B

Semifinals

Gold medal match

Golf

Uruguay qualified a team of three golfers (one man and two women).

Gymnastics

Artistic
Uruguay qualified 2 athletes.

Men
Individual Qualification
Cristhian Meneses

Women
Individual Qualification
Debora Reis

Handball

Uruguay has qualified a men's and women's team. Each team will consist of 15 athletes, for a total of 30.

Men's tournament

Group A

Semifinals

Bronze medal match

Women's tournament

Group B

Semifinals

Bronze medal match

Judo

Uruguay qualified two male judokas.

Men

Karate

Uruguay has qualified 1 male karateka.

Modern pentathlon

Uruguay has qualified two athletes (one man and one woman).

Rowing

Uruguay has qualified three boats and five male rowers.

Men

Qualification Legend: FA=Final A (medal); FB=Final B (non-medal); R=Repechage

Rugby sevens

Uruguay has qualified a men's team of 12 athletes.

Men's tournament

Roster

Group A

Quarterfinals

Semifinals

Bronze medal match

Sailing

Uruguay qualified 2 boats.

Shooting

Uruguay qualified 1 female shooter. Diana Cabrera was a Canadian born shooter who competed in her hometown at the games for the country of her parents birth.

Women

Swimming

Uruguay qualified two swimmers (one male and one female).

Table tennis

Uruguay has qualified one woman.

Women

Taekwondo

Uruguay has qualified a team of two male athletes. It further received a female wildcard spot.

Tennis

Uruguay qualified three male athletes.

Men

Triathlon

Uruguay qualified one male triathlete.

Men

Weightlifting

Uruguay has qualified one man.

Men

See also
Uruguay at the 2016 Summer Olympics

References

Nations at the 2015 Pan American Games
Panamerican Games
2015